Phyllonorycter grewiella is a moth of the family Gracillariidae. It is known from South Africa, Botswana, Kenya, Namibia and coastal Yemen. The habitat consists of the coastal savannahs of southern and East Africa and the forests belonging to the Zanzibar-Inhambane floristic region.

The length of the forewings is 2.4–2.8 mm. The forewings are ochreous dark golden with a metallic shine and with white markings. The hindwings are greyish fuscous with a long pale golden shiny fringe. Adults have been reared and collected during every month of the year except August, October and December.

The larvae feed on Grewia bicolor, Grewia flava, Grewia flavescens, Grewia hexamita, Grewia messinica, Grewia monticola and Grewia villosa. They mine the leaves of their host plant. The mine has the form of a moderate, oval or oblong, opaque tentiform mine, usually on the upperside of the leaf. The frass is black and deposited loose in mine. Pupation takes place without a cocoon.

References

Moths described in 1961
grewiella
Moths of Africa
Moths of the Middle East